HRE may refer to:

Hanno R. Ellenbogen Citizenship Award, an annual award ceremony
Hrê language, a North Bahnaric language spoken in Vietnam, mainly by the H're people
 H're people, an ethnic group of Vietnam who largely speak the Hrê language
 Harare International Airport, in Zimbabwe
 Holy Roman Empire, a multi-ethnic complex of territories in central Europe between 800 and 1806
 Holy Roman Emperor, the leader of the Holy Roman Empire, nominally in charge of these territories
 Hormone response element, a DNA sequence within genes, involved in the regulation of the genes' expression
 Hudson River Expressway, a proposed highway in New York state, United States
 Human rights education
 Hypo Real Estate, a German holding company and commercial property lender
 Hybrid Rocket Engine, a type of rocket engine with fuel and oxidizer in different states
 Waco HRE, an American biplane
 HRE, a Rockwell scale of hardness